The 14th Dalai Lama has received numerous awards over his spiritual and political career. He was a laureate for community leadership in 1959 Ramon Magsaysay Awards, Asia's version of Nobel Prize. On 22 June 2006, he became the third person to be recognised with Honorary Citizenship by the Governor General of Canada. On 28 May 2005, he received the Christmas Humphreys Award from the Buddhist Society in the United Kingdom. Most notable was the Nobel Peace Prize, presented in Oslo on 10 December 1989.

Notable awards and honors

Nobel Peace Prize
On 10 December 1989 the Dalai Lama was awarded the Nobel Peace Prize. The committee recognized his efforts in "the struggle of the liberation of Tibet and the efforts for a peaceful resolution instead of using violence." The chairman of the Nobel committee said that the award was "in part a tribute to the memory of Mahatma Gandhi."
In his acceptance speech the Dalai Lama criticised China for using force against student protesters during the Tiananmen Square protests of 1989. He said the victims' efforts were not in vain. His speech focused on the importance of the continued use of non-violence and his desire to maintain a dialogue with China to try to resolve the situation.
Made by Shakti Nandan

References

Dalai
14th Dalai Lama
Dalai